The Washburn Ichabods football program represents Washburn University in college football. They participate in Division II sports within the NCAA. The team plays their home games in Yager Stadium at Moore Bowl, located on the Washburn campus in Topeka, Kansas.

Washburn's football program dates back to 1891. The Ichabods claimed one MIAA conference championship in 2005, but 12 conference championships all together. Under Craig Schurig, the Ichabods have appeared in the Division II playoffs in 2005, 2007, and 2011; and competed in bowl games in 2004, 2010, 2016, and 2017.

History

Schurig era

Post-season play

Championships

Conference championships
Source:

All-time record vs. current MIAA teams
Official record (including any NCAA imposed vacates and forfeits) against all current MIAA opponents as of the end of the 2015 season:

Stadium

The Ichabods have played their home games in Yager Stadium since 1928.

Notable players
Pierre Desir - NFL cornerback 
 Brian Folkerts – NFL and AFL offensive lineman
 Mal Stevens – College Football Hall of Famer
 Cary Williams – Super Bowl XLVII champion with the Baltimore Ravens
 Michael Wilhoite - NFL and UFL linebacker. Played five years with the San Francisco 49ers (2012-2016) and in March 2017 he signed with the Seattle Seahawks.
 Corey Ballentine – drafted in the 6th round of the 2019 NFL Draft
 Kyle Hinton – drafted in the 7th round of the 2020 NFL Draft

References

External links
 

 
American football teams established in 1891
1891 establishments in Kansas